ADAM metallopeptidase with thrombospondin type 1 motif 6 is a protein that in humans is encoded by the ADAMTS6 gene.

Function

This gene encodes a member of the ADAMTS (a disintegrin and metalloproteinase with thrombospondin motifs) protein family. Members of the family share several distinct protein modules, including a propeptide region, a metalloproteinase domain, a disintegrin-like domain, and a thrombospondin type 1 (TS) motif. Individual members of this family differ in the number of C-terminal TS motifs, and some have unique C-terminal domains. The encoded preproprotein is proteolytically processed to generate the mature enzyme. Expression of this gene may be regulated by the cytokine TNF-alpha.

Mutation in ADAMTS6 causes predisposition to hernias.

References

Further reading 

ADAMTS